Janneke Louisa-Muller (born 1965) is a Dutch civil servant and former politician. From 12 May 2012 to 1 January 2013 she was Party Chairwoman of the ChristianUnion (ChristenUnie). She succeeded Peter Blokhuis and was succeeded by Klaas Tigelaar. Furthermore, she is town clerk of Wijk bij Duurstede.

Louisa studied social and economic geography at the University of Groningen. She is married, lives in Cothen, and is an Evangelical.

References 
 'Eén vrouw op drie is geen slechte score', Trouw, 12 May 2012

1965 births
Living people
Christian Union (Netherlands) politicians
21st-century Dutch politicians
Dutch civil servants
Dutch geographers
Economic geographers
Chairmen of the Christian Union (Netherlands)
People from Wijk bij Duurstede
Social geographers
United Pentecostal and Evangelical Churches members
University of Groningen alumni
21st-century Dutch women politicians